Nazio-Juve was the nickname of the group of Juventus F.C. players called up to have been the backbone to the Italy national football team managed by Vittorio Pozzo to have won the 1934 FIFA World Cup and two editions of the Central European International Cup (1927–30 and 1933–35).

With this group the side managed by Carlo Carcano have dominated the Italian football and had one of the best teams in Europe during the first half of the 1930s, winning amongst others a record of five national championships in a row and reached the Central European Club Cup's semifinals since 1932 to 1935, and included the formidable defensive trio Combi-Rosetta-Caligaris, Giovanni Ferrari, Felice Borel II and the oriundi Luis Monti, Raimundo Orsi and Renato Cesarini.

Players

Italy players that won the 1934 FIFA World Cup and/or the 1927–30 and 1933–35 Central European International Cup.

 Luigi Bertolini
 Carlo Bigatto I
 Felice Placido Borel II
 Umberto Caligaris
 Luigi Cevenini III
 Renato Cesarini
 Gianpiero Combi
 Giovanni Ferrari
 Luis Monti 
 Federico Munerati
 Raimundo Orsi
  Virginio Rosetta
 Mario Varglien I
 Giovanni Varglien II
 Giovanni Vecchina

See also
 Italy national football team
 Juventus F.C. and the Italy national football team
 Blocco-Juve

Footnotes and references

Bibliography
 
 

Nazio-Juve
Nazio-Juve
Nicknamed groups of association football players
History of football in Italy
1930–31 in Italian football
1931–32 in Italian football
1932–33 in Italian football
1933–34 in Italian football
1934–35 in Italian football
Italy at the 1934 FIFA World Cup